Germany–New Zealand relations refers to the current and historical relations between Germany and New Zealand. The importance of their relations centers on the history of German migration to New Zealand. Approximately 200,000 New Zealanders are of German descent, and many German tourists visit New Zealand each year. Both nations are members of the Australia Group, Organisation for Economic Co-operation and Development and the United Nations.

History
The first German migrants to arrive to New Zealand took place circa 1842. Between 1843 and 1914 around 10,000 arrived, mainly from northern Germany. During World War I, New Zealand declared war on Germany in August 1914 following Great Britains declaration of war. Soon after declaring war, New Zealand sent an expeditionary force and occupied the German Samoan islands. New Zealand soldiers also fought against German troops at the Western Front. Back in New Zealand, the government interned many Germans as enemy aliens on Somes Island and Motuihe Island.

In World War II, New Zealand was one of the first countries to declare war on Germany, on 3 September 1939, the third day of the German invasion of Poland. New Zealand soldiers (as part of the British Empire) fought against German forces during the Battle of Greece, Battle of Crete, Western Desert campaign, Tunisian campaign and the Italian campaign. The New Zealand Māori Battalion also partook in the war following in the footsteps of the Māori Pioneer Battalion that had served during the First World War.

In 1953 West Germany and New Zealand established diplomatic relations. After the German reunification in 1990, New Zealand continued to maintain diplomatic relations with Germany. Since Germany and New Zealand established diplomatic relations, both countries have developed a partnership marked by close mutual trust. This partnership is based on shared interests and values and it has often made the two countries like-minded partners in international affairs, trade, research and cultural exchange. Both nations have cultivated good relations with numerous high-level visits such as German Chancellor Angela Merkel’s visit to New Zealand in 2014 and New Zealand's Prime Minister Jacinda Ardern's visit to Germany in April 2018.

High-level visits
High-level visits from Germany to New Zealand
 President Johannes Rau (2001)
 Chancellor Angela Merkel (2014)
 President Frank-Walter Steinmeier (2017)

High-level visits from New Zealand to Germany
 Prime Minister Helen Clark (2005)
 Prime Minister John Key (2015)
 Prime Minister Bill English (2017)
 Prime Minister Jacinda Ardern (2018)

Trade
In 2019, trade between Germany and New Zealand totaled US$4 billion. Germany's main exports to New Zealand include: motor vehicles; mechanical machinery and equipment; pharmaceutical products and electrical machinery. New Zealand's main exports to Germany include: meat; optical and medical equipment; fruit; casein; fish and wool.

Resident diplomatic missions
 Germany has an embassy in Wellington.
 New Zealand has an embassy in Berlin and a consulate-general in Hamburg.

See also
 German New Zealanders
 Military history of New Zealand during World War I
 Military history of New Zealand during World War II

References 

 
 
New Zealand
Germany